Carathis is a genus of moths in the family Erebidae. The genus was described by Augustus Radcliffe Grote in 1866.

Species
Carathis alayorum Becker, 2011
Carathis australis Rothschild, 1909
Carathis byblis (Schaus, 1892)
Carathis gortynoides Grote, [1866]
Carathis palpalis (Walker, 1855)
Carathis septentrionalis Becker, 2011

Former species
Carathis klagesi, now Tessella klagesi (Rothschild, 1909)

References

Becker, V. O. (2011). "A review of the neotropical moth genus Carathis Grote (Lepidoptera: Arctiidae)". Tropical Lepidoptera Research. 21 (2): 95–97.

External links

Phaegopterina
Moth genera